Atash may refer to:

 The New Persian word for Atar, the Zoroastrian concept of holy fire
 Atash Behram, the highest grade of a fire that can be placed in a fire temple
 Atash, Iran, a village in Khuzestan Province, Iran
 Atesh, a defunct newspaper in Iran
 Mohammed Nadir Atash, Afghan-American educator